William Russell Hennessy Dippie (9 June 1907 — 15 February 1997) was a Scottish first-class cricketer.

Dippie was born at Edinburgh in June 1907. A club cricketer for Brunswick, he made a single appearance in first-class cricket for Scotland against Ireland at Dublin in 1939. Playing in the Scottish team as a right-arm fast-medium bowler, he went wicketless in the Irish first innings, but took figures of 3 for 41. As a lower order batsman, he ended the Scottish first innings unbeaten on 7 runs, while in their second innings he was dismissed without scoring by James Boucher. Outside of cricket, he was by profession an electrician. Dippie died in England at Dudley in February 1997.

References

External links
 

1907 births
1997 deaths
Cricketers from Edinburgh
Scottish cricketers